Rosemary Carter was a popular writer of 37 romance novels in Mills & Boon from 1975 to 2000.

Bibliography

Single novels
Land of the Flamenco (1975)
Man of the Wild (1976)
Forests of the Dragon (1976)
Adam's Bride (1978)
Sweet Imposter (1978)
Bush Doctor (1978)
The Awakening (1979)
Return to Devil's View (1979)
My Darling Spitfire (1979)
Man in the Shadows (1979)
Desert Dream (1980)
Face in the Portrait (1980)
Kelly's Man (1980)
Another Life (1981)
Safari Encounter (1981)
Daredevil (1982)
Master of Tinarva (1982)
Serpent in Paradise (1983)
Lion's Domain (1983)
Letter from Bronze Mountain (1984)
Impetuous Marriage (1985)
A Forever Affair (1985)
Pillow Portraits (1985)
Walk into Tomorrow (1986)
No Greater Joy (1988)
Partners in Passion (1989)
Echoes in the Night (1990)
Certain of Nothing (1991)
Captive Bride (1993)
Night of the Scorpion (1993)
Games Lovers Play (1994)
Tender Captive (1996)
Family Man (1996)
Cowboy to the Altar (1997)
A Husband Made in Texas (1997)
A Wife and Child (1999)
A Wife Worth Keeping (2000)

Collections
4 Titles By Carter: Pillow Portraits; Daredevil; The Awakening; Another Life (1995)

Omnibus in collaboration
Romance Treasury (1987) (with Mary Burchell and Victoria Gordon) (Yours with Love; Man in the Shadows; The Everywhere Man)

References and sources
Harlequin Enterprises Ltd's Website

External links
Rosemary Carter's Webpage in Fantastic Fiction's Website

American romantic fiction writers
Women romantic fiction writers
Living people
Year of birth missing (living people)
20th-century American novelists
American women novelists
20th-century American women writers
21st-century American women